Abdollah Hosseini (born 6 July 1990) is an Iranian footballer who plays as a defender for Tractor in the Persian Gulf Pro League.

References

1990 births
Iranian footballers
Living people
Association football central defenders
Gol Gohar players
People from Nur, Iran
Sportspeople from Mazandaran province